The Olympus FTL  was a 35mm single-lens reflex camera (SLR) sold by Olympus between 1971 and 1972. It was a transition model between the Pen F half-frame SLR and full-frame M-1. 
The FTL was a very traditional SLR with 42mm screw lenses.

Lenses

Wide Angle Lenses
 28mm f3.5
 35mm f2.8

Standard Lenses
 50mm f1.8
 50mm f1.4

Telephoto Lenses
 135mm f3.5
 200mm f4

Accessories
Despite the relatively short product life cycle, there was still a full range of accessories available for the FTL.

 Set of three extension rings 
 Macro bellows 
 Focusing rail 
 Slide copier 
 Microscope adapter 
 Close-up lenses, two models 
 Repro stand 
 Electronic flash unit 
 Filters 
 Lens hoods

See also
 List of Olympus products

References

External links
 Olympus Global Website
 Olympus America Inc.

FTL